Johnny Aquino (born December 22, 1978) is a Uruguayan former footballer who played as a midfielder for clubs including Sarmiento de Junín of the Primera B Metropolitana in Argentina.

External links
 
 

1978 births
Living people
People from Maldonado Department
Uruguayan footballers
Uruguayan expatriate footballers
Aldosivi footballers
All Boys footballers
Ferro Carril Oeste footballers
Club Atlético Sarmiento footballers
Expatriate footballers in Argentina
Association football midfielders